Samuel Levine may refer to:
 Samuel Levine (mobster) (1903–1972), American mobster
 Samuel A. Levine (1891–1966), cardiologist
 Samm Levine (born 1982), actor
 Samuel Z. Levine (1895–1971), American pediatrician